Arum is a plant genus.

Arum may also refer to:

Places
 Arum, Armenia
 Arum, Netherlands
 Årum, Fredrikstad municipality, Norway

Surname or given name
Areum (name), also spelled Arŭm, Korean feminine given name (including a list of people with the name)
Bob Arum (born 1931), American lawyer and businessman; founder of boxing promotion company Top Rank
Richard Arum (born 1963), American sociology professor
Arum (Vala), one of the Valar in J. R. R. Tolkien's legendarium

Other uses
Araceae, a family of plants called the "arum family"

See also

Erum (disambiguation)